Marc Bergevin (born August 11, 1965) is a Canadian professional ice hockey executive and former player. He is currently senior advisor to the general manager of the Los Angeles Kings. Bergevin played as a defenceman in the NHL.

Playing career
As a youth, Bergevin played in the 1978 Quebec International Pee-Wee Hockey Tournament with a minor ice hockey team from Ville-Émard, which included Mario Lemieux and J. J. Daigneault.

Bergevin was drafted by the NHL's Chicago Blackhawks in the 1983 NHL Entry Draft, third round, 59th overall. After a junior career with the Chicoutimi Saguenéens of the Quebec Major Junior Hockey League (QMJHL), he made the Black Hawks in 1984 and played with Chicago for the next five seasons before being traded to the New York Islanders. His career with the Islanders was brief, and he spent much of that time with their American Hockey League (AHL) affiliate Springfield Indians, whom he helped lead to consecutive Calder Cup championships in 1990 and 1991. In the 1991 season he was traded to the Hartford Whalers and became a fan favorite for his skilled checking. The 1991–92 season was his best, statistically, scoring 7 goals and 17 assists for 24 points.

Bergevin went on to sign with the expansion Tampa Bay Lightning the next season, becoming a leader for the fledgling franchise and continuing to play skillfully enough to be named to the gold medal-winning Canadian national team for the 1994 World Championships. After three years with the Lightning, he played for the Detroit Red Wings, St. Louis Blues, Pittsburgh Penguins and the Vancouver Canucks, and was known for his practical jokes in the locker room.

Bergevin served as an alternate captain during part of his time with the Penguins, Lightning and Blues.

Retirement
Bergevin retired after the 2003–04 NHL season, and despite two stints in the minors and serious injuries in his final years, was in the top 100 in NHL history at the time of his retirement in games played in the NHL with 1,191. He finished his career with 36 goals, 145 assists for 181 points and 1,090 penalty minutes.

Management career
After his retirement, Bergevin was a professional scout with the Blackhawks' organization. In 2008, he served as an assistant coach for the Blackhawks after three seasons with their scouting staff. In July 2009, he was appointed the team's director of player personnel. While in this position, the Blackhawks won the Stanley Cup in 2010.

On June 15, 2011, Bergevin was promoted to assistant general manager of the Chicago Blackhawks. He replaced Kevin Cheveldayoff, who had left the Blackhawks organization to accept the general manager position with the new Winnipeg Jets team.

On May 2, 2012, Bergevin was named general manager and executive vice president of the Montreal Canadiens. His first additions to the Canadiens included Rick Dudley as assistant general manager, Scott Mellanby as director of player personnel, Martin Lapointe as director of player development and Michel Therrien as head coach. Other additions included the hiring of Kirk Muller as an associate coach in 2016, as well as Gerard Gallant, J. J. Daigneault and Clément Jodoin as assistant coaches. Bergevin also appointed former Canadiens defenseman Patrice Brisebois as player development coach on June 13, 2012. He finished second in voting for the General Manager of the Year award for the 2013–14 season, and again in the 2020–21 season.

On November 28, 2021, Bergevin was fired from the Montreal Canadiens.

On January 9, 2022, Bergevin was hired as a senior advisor to the general manager for the Los Angeles Kings.

Career statistics

Regular season and playoffs

International

See also
List of NHL players with 1000 games played

References

External links

1965 births
Living people
Canadian ice hockey defencemen
Capital District Islanders players
Chicago Blackhawks coaches
Chicago Blackhawks draft picks
Chicago Blackhawks executives
Chicago Blackhawks players
Chicago Blackhawks scouts
Chicoutimi Saguenéens (QMJHL) players
Detroit Red Wings players
Hartford Whalers players
Ice hockey people from Montreal
Montreal Canadiens executives
New York Islanders players
Pittsburgh Penguins players
Saginaw Hawks players
St. Louis Blues players
Springfield Indians players
Stanley Cup champions
Tampa Bay Lightning players
Vancouver Canucks players
Worcester IceCats players